Forest horse may refer to:

 The Black Forest horse, or Schwarzwälder Kaltblut
 New Forest Pony
 The "Forest Horse", a hypothetical ancestral horse prototype proposed in the 20th century; see History of horse domestication theories